Cornelis Hendrik Willem de Bois (19 June 1896 – 1 August 1975) was a Dutch football manager and player who played for AFC Ajax in the Netherlands. During his managerial career he managed the Dutch Guyana national team (now known as Suriname), DFC, DOS, RBC, Go Ahead, SC Veendam, VV Oldenzaal, Quick '20 and Tubantia.

Career 
Born 19 June 1896 in Steenwijk, Overijssel, De Bois relocated to Amsterdam to play for AFC Ajax. De Bois made 64 appearances in the attack of Ajax, scoring 11 goals and helping his team to win the national championship in the 1930–31 season, his final season with the club.

Managerial career
As one of the first football managers to be certified by the Royal Dutch Football Association (KNVB), De Bois took a managerial position with BVV De Kennemers in 1931. After three seasons he became manager of Hermes DVS, only to manage Sportclub Enschede three seasons later. From 1941 to 1948 he was the manager of DFC (now known as FC Dordrecht).

In 1948, De Bois became the manager of the Dutch Guyana national team, Dutch Guyana being the predecessor of Suriname, as the Dutch colony was known prior to 1976. He made his first appearance as newly appointed manager on 18 December 1948 in a 4–3 loss to Martinique.

After his brief stint in South America, De Bois returned to the Netherlands, taking the manager position at VV DOS in Utrecht. In 1952 he then relocated to Roosendaal to manage RBC. In 1957 he became manager of SC Veendam, whom he led to a Tweede Klasse championship, and promotion to the Eerste Divisie in 1959. He later managed VV Oldenzaal, Quick '20 and Tubantia, before retiring as a manager.

Death
On 1 August 1975, De Bois was killed in a car accident near his home in Oldenzaal, it was the day that his former club AFC Ajax had organized a ceremonial friendly match between the senior teams of Ajax and FC Twente in honor of De Bois, who had officially declared his retirement from the sport that same year.

Career statistics

Player

Honours

Player
AFC Ajax
 National championship: 1930–31

Coach
 SC Veendam
 Tweede Divisie: 1958–59

References 

1896 births
1975 deaths
People from Steenwijkerland
Association football forwards
Dutch footballers
AFC Ajax players
Dutch football managers
Hermes DVS managers
FC Dordrecht managers
Suriname national football team managers
RBC Roosendaal managers
Go Ahead Eagles managers
SC Veendam managers
Dutch expatriate football managers
Dutch expatriate sportspeople in Suriname
Expatriate football managers in Suriname
Road incident deaths in the Netherlands
Quick '20 players
Footballers from Overijssel